Shanmugam Saravanan is an Indian cinematographer and film director who works mainly in the Indian film industry. He is an alumnus of the M.G.R. Government Film and Television Training Institute. He started his career with Poove Unakkaga, a Tamil romantic film starring Vijay and Sangita and was released in the year 1996. He debuted as a director by his directorial venture Silambattam. Saravanan is well known for his association with Directors Vikraman and Suresh Krissna. He has worked as a cinematographer in more than 25 films in Tamil, Telugu, and Malayalam.

Early life and career

The son of poet Ulundurpettai Shanmugham, after completing the Diploma in cinematography from the M.G.R. Government Film and Television Training Institute, Chennai, he assisted senior cinematographer P. Selvakumar in the team of Aabavanan. Later, he made his cinematography debut in the film Amma Ponnu. After watching his work in that film Director Vikraman called and offered him to do cinematography for his next venture titled Pudhiya Mannargal. His work was well appreciated in that movie. He then continued to work with Director Vikraman in the films Poove Unakkaga and Suryavamsam. Both the films were a huge commercial success and was also remade in other Indian Languages.

In 1995, he did a Telugu drama film Stri, directed by K. S. Sethumadhavan. The film has garnered two National Film Awards and also showcased in the Indian Panorama section, International Film Festival of India and 2nd Prague International Film Festival.

He then teamed up with director Suresh Krissna and did films like Aahaa..!, Auto Driver, Sangamam.

In 2008, Saravanan made his directorial debut in the film Silambattam, a Tamil action comedy film. The film starred Silambarasan Rajendar in dual roles while Sneha, Sana Khan, Prabhu and Kishore also play lead roles. Yuvan Shankar Raja composed the film's background score and soundtrack. The film was a huge commercial success. The film released on 19 December 2008.

Legacy
Saravanan has mentored some of the prominent cinematographers in the South Indian film industry, who had all assisted him including Vijay Milton, R. Madhi, Vetri and Manoj Paramahamsa.

Filmography

As cinematographer

As Director

References

External links
 
 

Living people
Tamil film directors
Tamil film cinematographers
Telugu film cinematographers
Malayalam film cinematographers
M.G.R. Government Film and Television Training Institute alumni
Cinematographers from Tamil Nadu
1972 births